The women's 500 metres races of the 2014–15 ISU Speed Skating World Cup 4, arranged in the Thialf arena in Heerenveen, Netherlands, were held on the weekend of 12–14 December 2014.

Race one was won by Lee Sang-hwa of South Korea, while Nao Kodaira of Japan came second, and Judith Hesse of Germany came third. Angelina Golikova of Russia won Division B of race one, and was thus, under the rules, automatically promoted to Division A for race two.

Race two was won by Heather Richardson of the United States, while Brittany Bowe of the United States came second, and Nao Kodaira of Japan came third. Marsha Hudey of Canada won Division B of race two.

Race 1
Race one took place on Friday, 12 December, with Division B scheduled in the morning session, at 12:00, and Division A scheduled in the afternoon session, at 16:59.

Division A

Division B

Race 2
Race two took place on Sunday, 14 December, with Division B scheduled in the morning session, at 11:31, and Division A scheduled in the afternoon session, at 15:47.

Division A

Division B

References

Women 0500
4